JBB may refer to:
 Joint Base Balad, an Iraqi Air Force base
 Notohadinegoro Airport, the IATA code JBB
 JBB Thrissur, an autonomous music, dance and arts school
 JBB, a benchmark suite